Noviz-e Olya (also Romanized as Novīz-ye ‘Olyā; also known as Novīz) is a village in Bala Taleqan Rural District, in the Central District of Taleqan County, Alborz Province, Iran. At the 2006 census, its population was 283, in 72 families.

References 

Populated places in Taleqan County